The Rainier class is a class of tug boats built for the United States Navy. Construction on the first tug commenced in 2019.

Ships in class

References

External links
 NavSource

Auxiliary ship classes of the United States Navy